Cav. Fulvio Conti (born Rome, 28 October 1947) is an Italian financier. Recently served as Chief executive Officer and General manager of Italy's largest power company.

He joined Enel in 1999 as Chief Financial Officer. As CEO he finalized the acquisition of the Slovak utility, Slovenkse Elektrarne and he achieved the takeover of Endesa, the leading power company in Spain and Latin America, as well as the takeover of the Russian power company OGK 5.

He started his career at Mobil Oil, where in 1989, he was appointed Chief Financial Officer at Mobil Oil Europe in London. In 1991, he headed the Administration Finance and Control for Europe at the American company Campbell.

One year later he came back to Italy as Chief Financial Officer at Montecatini and in 1993, he joined the Parent company Montedison-Compart. In 1996, he was appointed General Director as well as Chief Financial Officer at Ferrovie dello Stato, the Italian Railways company.

In 1998, he joined Telecom Italia as General Director and Board Member of TIM and other major companies of the Group. He also had the position of Chief Financial Officer.

He has a degree in Economics at “La Sapienza” University, Rome. In 2007, he was awarded with the Doctor Honoris Causa degree in Electrical Engineering, from Genoa University.

He is a lecturer of Corporate Finance at the MBA, School of Economics of the LUISS University, Rome.

In May 2009, he was appointed “Cavaliere del Lavoro” of the Italian Republic and in December of the same year he became “Officier de la Légion d’Honneur “of the French Republic.

He sits in the Board of Directors of the UK financial services Group Barclays plc, the US insurance Group AON and of the National Academy of Santa Cecilia. He is Chairman of EURELECTRIC and deputy Chairman of Endesa.

He has been Chief Executive Officer and General Director of Enel from May 2005  until May 2014.

References

Businesspeople from Rome
Italian corporate directors
1947 births
Living people
British corporate directors
Chief financial officers
Italian chief executives
Endesa